She Who Weeps is the fifth studio album by American jazz singer Cassandra Wilson. It was released on June 25, 1991.

Reception

Writing for AllMusic, Scott Yanow described the album as a "transition of sorts" for the artist, and noted some traces of her earlier M-Base style. Overall, he called the album "Interesting but not overly memorable". John Fordham of The Guardian stated: "This is Cassandra Wilson in 1990, two years after her powerful standards album Blue Skies, and three before she turned to the rootsy, blues-based folk-jazz she still pursues variations on today."

Track listing
 "Iconic Memories" (Cassandra Wilson) – 5:07
 "Chelsea Bridge" (Billy Strayhorn) – 6:34
 "Out Loud (Jeris' Blues)" (Steve Coleman, Wilson) – 4:23
 "She Who Weeps" (Mary Fowlkes) – 3:31
 "Angel" (Carolyn Franklin, Sonny Saunders) – 4:42
 "Body and Soul" (Edward Heyman, Robert Sour, Frank Eyton, Johnny Green) – 10:47
 "New African Blues" (Wilson) – 5:32

Personnel
Cassandra Wilson – vocals, drum programming
Jean-Paul Bourelly – guitar
Herman Fowlkes – bass
Kevin Bruce Harris – bass
Reggie Washington – bass
Rod Williams – piano
Mark Johnson – drums
Tani Tabbal – drums
Production notes
Cassandra Wilson – producer
Jean-Paul Bourelly – producer
Stefan F. Winter – producer, executive producer, packaging
Joseph Marciano – engineer
Adrian VonRipka – mastering
Diana Klein – artwork, illustrations
Steve Byram – cover design
Günter Mattei – cover design

Chart positions

References

1991 albums
Cassandra Wilson albums
JMT Records albums